Al-Nufour (Arabic: النفور) is a Syrian village in the Qatana District of the Rif Dimashq Governorate. According to the Syria Central Bureau of Statistics (CBS), Al-Nufour had a population of 1,203 in the 2004 census.

History
In 1838, Eli Smith noted  Al-Nufour as a village between Damascus  and the Hauran.

References

Bibliography

 

Populated places in Qatana District